From the time of the Great Depression through the 1990s, the politics of West Virginia were largely dominated by the Democratic Party. In the 2000 presidential election, George W. Bush claimed a surprise victory over Al Gore, with 52% of the vote; he won West Virginia again in 2004, with 56% of the vote. West Virginia is now a heavily Republican state, with John McCain winning the state in 2008, Mitt Romney in 2012 and Donald Trump in 2016 and 2020.

Before 2000, West Virginia had a Democratic voting streak from 1932, only voting Republican in Eisenhower, Nixon, and Reagan’s national landslide victories. Although starting with the 2000 election, West Virginia began its sharp realignment from mostly supporting Democrats to mostly supporting Republicans. In 2016, Democratic candidate Jim Justice was elected Governor of West Virginia. Seven months into his term, he switched affiliation to the Republican Party, making Joe Manchin the last prominent Democratic officeholder in the state. Manchin narrowly won his U.S. Senate seat by 3% in 2018, a sharp decline from his 24% margin of victory in 2012. The state is now a Republican stronghold. Republican presidential candidate Donald Trump won 68.5% of the vote in 2016 and 68.6% in 2020, Trump’s second-best statewide performance both times, only less than Wyoming.

In a 2020 study, West Virginia was ranked as the 16th hardest state for citizens to vote in.

History

Robert C. Byrd, a Democrat, represented the state of West Virginia in Congress for over 57 years, as a Member of the House from the now-defunct 6th District from 1953 to 1959, and as a United States Senator from 1959 to 2010. He served as Democratic Senate Leader from 1977 to 1989. In 2006 he became the longest-serving Senator in history, and in 2009 the longest-serving member of Congress in history. Senator Byrd died of pneumonia on June 28, 2010, aged 92. Governor Joe Manchin appointed Carte Goodwin to fill the seat until a special election was held in November 2010. Manchin was elected to the seat to fulfill the remainder of Byrd's term.

In the Republican landslide of 1988, it was one of only ten states, and the only southern state (as defined by the United States Census), to give its electoral votes to Michael Dukakis; it was one of only six states to support Jimmy Carter over Ronald Reagan in 1980; and it supported Bill Clinton by large margins in both 1992 and 1996. The state has trended increasingly Republican in presidential elections; despite the earlier Democratic wins in presidential match-ups, it narrowly elected George W. Bush over Al Gore in 2000, then re-elected Bush by a much larger margin in 2004 and voted for John McCain in 2008 by a slightly larger margin than 2004. West Virginia was one of only 5 states, the others being Arkansas, Louisiana, Oklahoma and Tennessee, where McCain won by a larger margin in 2008 than George W. Bush in 2004.  Mitt Romney won the state in the 2012 presidential election with 62% of the vote, a significant improvement over McCain's 56% vote share in 2008 and the first time in modern American history that a Republican candidate for president won every county in the state. Republican Presidential candidate Donald Trump won the state with a 42% margin, outdoing Romney's performance substantially.

In the 2014 elections, the GOP took control of the state legislature for the first time in 80 years, and it took one of West Virginia's two U.S. Senate seats and all three U.S. House districts. In the 2016 elections, the Republicans held on to their seats and made gains in the State Senate and gained three statewide offices.

West Virginia's U.S. Senators are Joe Manchin, a Democrat, and Shelley Moore Capito, a Republican. The three seats in the United States House of Representatives are occupied by Republicans David McKinley, Alex Mooney, and Carol Miller. Republicans also maintain strong positions in statewide offices and the state legislature. Democrats continue to hold many local offices. West Virginia also has a very strong tradition of union membership.

Democratic politicians in the state are typically more conservative than the national party, especially on social issues. The late Senator Robert Byrd opposed affirmative action and same-sex marriage. Senior Senator and former Governor Joe Manchin and former Congressman Nick Rahall are anti-abortion. National Democrats such as Barack Obama, Nancy Pelosi and Harry Reid are extremely unpopular in West Virginia. As of late 2011, President Obama had a 24% approval rating in the state, with 76% disapproving  During his 2010 Senate campaign, then-Governor Joe Manchin released an ad touting his endorsement from the Republican-leaning NRA and slamming Obama's then-proposed cap and trade legislation.

Voter registration

Demographics
Evangelical Christians comprised 52 percent of the state's voters in 2008. A poll in 2005 showed that 53 percent of West Virginia voters are anti-abortion, the seventh highest in the country. In 2006, 16 percent favored gay marriage. In 2008, 58 percent favored troop withdrawal from Iraq while just 32 percent wanted troops to remain. On fiscal policy in 2008, 52 percent said raising taxes on the wealthier individuals would benefit the economy, while 45 percent disagreed.

The most consistent support for Democrats is found in the coal fields of Southern West Virginia (McDowell, Mingo, Logan, Wyoming, and Boone Counties), as well as in the larger cities. Republicans are most numerous to the east of the Allegheny Mountains, especially in the state's Eastern Panhandle and Potomac Highlands, as well as in the Huntington and Charleston suburbs, most typified in Putnam County. The farming region of the Mid-Ohio Valley, particularly Wood, Jackson, and Mason Counties, also historically leans Republican. The Northern Panhandle and North-Central West Virginia regions usually split right down the middle in terms of being Republican or Democratic, as does the New River/Greenbrier Valley in the Southeast around Beckley, Bluefield, Fayetteville, and Lewisburg. Since 1996, coal interests have contributed more than $4 million to candidates for governor, the state Supreme Court and the West Virginia Legislature. The 2004 election was a record-setter for the coal industry. Gov. Joe Manchin received $571,214 from coal interests for his campaign and $174,500 for his inaugural. West Virginians for Coal, the West Virginia Coal Association's political action committee, contributed more money than any other coal industry donor.

Federal representation

Senate
Joe Manchin (D)
Shelley Moore Capito (R)

House of Representatives
Carol Miller (R)
Alex Mooney (R)

Judicary
West Virginia is part of the United States District Court for the Northern District of West Virginia and the United States District Court for the Southern District of West Virginia in the federal judiciary. The district's cases are appealed to the Richmond-based United States Court of Appeals for the Fourth Circuit.

See also
United States presidential elections in West Virginia
Political party strength in West Virginia
Government of West Virginia

References

External links

 West Virginia at Ballotpedia
 
 
  (State affiliate of the U.S. League of Women Voters)
 

 
Government of West Virginia
Political events in West Virginia